Muckle–Wells syndrome (MWS) is a rare autosomal dominant disease which causes sensorineural deafness and recurrent hives, and can lead to amyloidosis. Individuals with MWS often have episodic fever, chills, and joint pain. As a result, MWS is considered a type of periodic fever syndrome. MWS is caused by a defect in the CIAS1 gene which creates the protein cryopyrin. MWS is closely related to two other syndromes, familial cold urticaria and neonatal onset multisystem inflammatory disease—in fact, all three are related to mutations in the same gene and subsumed under the term cryopyrin-associated periodic syndromes (CAPS).

Sign and symptoms
 Sensorineural deafness
 Recurrent urticaria (hives)
 Fevers
 Chills
 Arthralgia (painful joints)

Causes
MWS occurs when a mutation in the CIAS1 gene, encoding for NLRP3, leads to increased activity of the protein cryopyrin. This protein is partly responsible for the body's response to damage or infection. During these states, a cytokine called interleukin 1β is produced by an innate immune cell known as a macrophage. This cytokine interacts with a receptor on the surface of other immune cells to produce symptoms of inflammation such as fever, arthritis, and malaise. In MWS, the increased activity of cryopyrin leads to an increase in interleukin 1β. This leads to inflammation all throughout the body with the associated symptoms.

Diagnosis

Treatment
 Treatment with anakinra, an interleukin 1 receptor antagonist, can lead to an improvement in the hearing loss.
 Rilonacept (Arcalyst) a dimeric fusion protein for the treatment of CAPS.
 Canakinumab, a monoclonal antibody against interleukin-1β

Prognosis
The chronic inflammation present in MWS over time can lead to sensorineural hearing loss. In addition, the prolonged inflammation can lead to deposition of proteins in the kidney, a condition known as amyloidosis.

History
MWS was first described in 1962 by Thomas James Muckle (1938-2014) and Michael Vernon Wells (born 1932).

Society and culture
The CBC Radio One program, White Coat, Black Art, hosted by Dr. Brian Goldman, presents a real-life study of the self-diagnosis by and successful treatment of a father and daughter with Muckle–Wells syndrome

In the episode of popular TV series House, the main patient of the Season 7 episode Recession Proof is ultimately diagnosed with this condition.In an episode of TV series Cake Boss, Buddy Valastro works with a girl with this condition through Make-A-Wish Foundation.

See also 
 Familial cold urticaria, a similar disease
 List of cutaneous conditions
 NOMID, a similar disease
 Urticarial syndromes
 CINCA Syndrome

References

External links 

Rheumatology
Autoinflammatory syndromes
Rare genetic syndromes
Syndromes with sensorineural hearing loss
Syndromes affecting the skin